Bukhara International Airport  is an airport serving Bukhara, the capital city of the Bukhara Region in Uzbekistan.

Facilities

Airlines and destinations

See also
List of the busiest airports in the former USSR
Transportation in Uzbekistan

References

External links
 
 
 Aeronautical chart for Bukhara (UTSB) at SkyVector

Airports in Uzbekistan
Bukhara Region
Bukhara